Aegyptianella is a genus in the phylum Pseudomonadota (Bacteria).

Etymology

The name Aegyptianella derives from:New Latin feminine gender dim. noun Aegyptianella (from Latin noun Aegyptus), named after Egypt where the organism was described (in 1929).

Species
The genus contains a single species, namely A. pullorum (Latin noun pullus, a young fowl, chicken; Latin genitive case pl. noun pullorum, of young fowls.)

See also
 Bacterial taxonomy
 Microbiology

References 

Bacteria genera
Monotypic bacteria genera
Rickettsiales